Lance I. Pugh (1919 – 26 December 1999) was a Canadian cyclist. He competed in three events at the 1948 Summer Olympics.

References

External links
 

1919 births
1999 deaths
Canadian male cyclists
Olympic cyclists of Canada
Cyclists at the 1948 Summer Olympics
Sportspeople from Oshawa